Edelino Miguel Ié (born 1 May 1994) is a Bissau-Guinean footballer who plays for GD Resende as a midfielder.

He made 41 Segunda Liga appearances for Sporting CP B and Braga B, but spent most of his career in the lower leagues.

Club career
Born in Bissau, Guinea Bissau, Ié joined Sporting CP's youth system in 2008, aged 14. He was promoted to the B team for the 2012–13 season, in the Segunda Liga.

Ié made his debut in the competition on 23 January 2013, coming on as a substitute for João Mário in a 2–1 away win against S.C. Covilhã. It was one of only two appearances during the campaign.

On 25 February 2015, Ié was loaned to FK Kruoja Pakruojis in the Lithuanian A Lyga. He scored his first senior goal on 25 June, to equalise in a 1–1 home draw against FC Stumbras.

On 12 September 2015, Ié was loaned to C.D. Cinfães from the Campeonato de Portugal for the rest of the season. The following day, he made his debut for his new team, playing 27 minutes and concluding a 3–0 home victory over C.D. Sobrado.

Ié joined S.C. Braga ahead of the 2016–17 season, being assigned to their reserves in the second division. He was released on 15 January 2018 and, the following day, signed a six-month contract with PAS Giannina F.C. which could be extended for two years depending on performances; the transfer to the latter club was however cancelled, for personal reasons.

In February 2018, Ié returned to Portugal's third tier and Cinfães. He spent the ensuing years in the same division, with F.C. Felgueiras 1932, Gondomar SC, G.D. Fontinhas and SC Mirandela.

Personal life
Ié's twin brother, Edgar, was also a footballer. A defender, he too was trained at Sporting.

Club statistics

References

External links

1994 births
Living people
Bissau-Guinean emigrants to Portugal
Identical twins
Portuguese twins
Twin sportspeople
Portuguese sportspeople of Bissau-Guinean descent
Sportspeople from Bissau
Bissau-Guinean footballers
Portuguese footballers
Association football midfielders
Liga Portugal 2 players
Campeonato de Portugal (league) players
Sporting CP B players
C.D. Cinfães players
S.C. Braga B players
F.C. Felgueiras 1932 players
Gondomar S.C. players
SC Mirandela players
A Lyga players
Portuguese expatriate footballers
Expatriate footballers in Lithuania
Portuguese expatriate sportspeople in Lithuania